The 1904 Holy Cross football team was an American football team that represented the College of the Holy Cross as an independent in the 1904 college football season.

In their second year under head coach Frank Cavanaugh, the team compiled a 2–5–2 record. Timothy F. Larkin was the team captain.

According to college records, Holy Cross played all of its home games at Holy Cross Field on the college campus in Worcester, Massachusetts. Contemporary reports suggest that one of the home games, a heavily hyped October 22 date with Dartmouth, may have been played at the team's former home stadium off campus, the Worcester Oval.

Schedule

References

Holy Cross
Holy Cross Crusaders football seasons
Holy Cross football